The year 2001 is the 9th year in the history of the Ultimate Fighting Championship (UFC), a mixed martial arts promotion based in the United States. In 2001 the UFC held 5 events beginning with, UFC 30: Battle on the Boardwalk.

Title fights

Debut UFC fighters

The following fighters fought their first UFC fight in 2001:

B.J. Penn
Caol Uno
Curtis Stout
Din Thomas
Elvis Sinosic
Frank Mir
Gil Castillo
Homer Moore

Joey Gilbert
Jutaro Nakao
Mark Robinson
Matt Serra
Paul Rodriguez
Phil Baroni
Phil Johns
Ricardo Almeida

Ricco Rodriguez
Sean Sherk
Semmy Schilt
Steve Berger
Tony DeSouza
Vladimir Matyushenko
Yves Edwards

Events list

See also
 UFC
 List of UFC champions
 List of UFC events

References

Ultimate Fighting Championship by year
2001 in mixed martial arts